Conostephium marchantiorum is a species of flowering plant in the heath family Ericaceae and is endemic to the south-west of Western Australia. It is an erect shrub with linear leaves clustered near the ends of branchlets, and pale green and pink, densely-bearded, tube-shaped flowers.

Description
The edges of the leaves are rolled under and the lower surface has several prominent longitudinal veins. The flowers are arranged singly in 2 to 4 leaf axils on each twig with small, egg-shaped bracts and several broader, overlapping bracteoles closely surrounding the flowers. The petal lobes are twice as long as the petal tube and densely bearded. Flowering has been observed in March, July and November.

Taxonomy and naming
Conostephium marchantiorum was first formally described in 1986 by Arne Strid in the journal Willdenowia from specimens he collected near Scaddan in 1983. The specific epithet (marchantiorum) honours Neville Graeme Marchant and his wife Denise.

Distribution and habitat
This leucopogon grows on sand on plains, creeklines and the edges of salt lakes in the Esperance Plains and Mallee bioregions of south-western Western Australia.

Conservation status
Leucopogon marchantiorum is  listed as "Priority Three" by the Government of Western Australia Department of Biodiversity, Conservation and Attractions, meaning that it is poorly known and known from only a few locations but is not under imminent threat.

References

marchantiorum
Ericales of Australia
Flora of Western Australia
Plants described in 1986
Taxa named by Arne Strid